WRSC-FM (95.3 MHz) is a radio station licensed to Bellefonte, Pennsylvania, serving the State College area. It currently airs a news/talk format.

History
When State College's radio station formats shuffled in 2004, the then-WZWW was one of the few FM stations that maintained its frequency. When the bars in State College tried to promote their respective businesses, they were confused as to which stations to hire.

On September 4, 2020, at 2 PM, after teasing a relaunch with construction noises between songs the previous day, WZWW shifted from Adult Contemporary to Hot Adult Contemporary, keeping the "3WZ" name. The first song after the relaunch was "Good as Hell" by Lizzo.

On December 20, 2022, it was announced that the format and branding would move to WMAJ within the following days and would be replaced by the news/talk format heard on WRSC.

On January 2, 2023, the station changed its call sign to WRSC-FM. On January 3, 2023, WRSC-FM changed its format to news/talk.

HD radio
On May 8, 2022, the station's third HD subchannel, simulcast on translator W268BB (101.5 FM), launched with a loop of "Kernkraft 400" by Zombie Nation, branding a "We Are 101.5", tied into the association of the song with Penn State University football and their "We Are Penn State" chants, and will launch a new format at noon on May 13. At the promised time, WZWW-HD3 launched an urban contemporary format, branded as "Loud 101.5", with the first song being "First Class" by Jack Harlow.

References

External links
Central PA Frequency Switches

RSC-FM
News and talk radio stations in the United States
Radio stations established in 1988
1988 establishments in Pennsylvania